The Jesse Kelly Show (formerly known as America Now and The Buck Sexton Show) is a three-hour early evening conservative talk radio show hosted by Jesse Kelly, and carried by Premiere Networks, a subsidiary of iHeartMedia, Inc.  It is broadcast live 6 to 9 p.m. Eastern Time on weekdays. The show mainly covers politics, and under former hosts, was intended as a broad-audience rundown of the day's news events, including entertainment topics, which was rare for a show on American talk radio in the 2010s. It airs on its affiliates either live or on tape delay, along with distribution through the iHeartRadio app and podcast providers.

Originally hosted by Andy Dean, America Now debuted on August 8, 2011. Joe Pagliarulo (known as "Joe Pags" and based at WOAI in San Antonio) replaced Dean as interim host beginning August 11, 2014. Pagliarulo ceded hosting duties to Meghan McCain (daughter of Senator John McCain) on July 15, 2015. McCain left the program on January 31, 2017, deciding to focus on television work instead.

Premiere Networks announced on February 1, 2017, that Buck Sexton would become the new host.  He began hosting the show on February 6. The show has since become a more traditional conservative talk show during his run. In early 2018, the America Now title was removed, and the program was rebranded as The Buck Sexton Show, a title previously used on his radio program with a video simulcast for TheBlaze from 2014 until 2017. Sexton's video simulcast moved to The First TV in October 2019.

On May 27, 2021, Premiere Networks announced that Clay Travis would be teamed with Sexton, and that the two would take over the noon–3 p.m. ET timeslot on June 21, 2021, as The Clay Travis and Buck Sexton Show.  The new program serves as the official replacement for The Rush Limbaugh Show, following a transitional period after Limbaugh died on February 17. 

On June 28, 2021, Jesse Kelly took over the timeslot under the title The Jesse Kelly Show. Since 2020, Kelly has been based at KPRC in Houston, a station owned by Premiere Networks parent company iHeartMedia, Inc.  He had been in limited syndication through Key Networks.

In a December 2021 interview with Tucker Carlson, he criticized President Biden’s Vice Chairman of the Joint Chiefs of Staff Christopher W. Grady further stating that "We don't need a military that's woman-friendly, that's gay-friendly" we need men "who want to sit on a throne of Chinese skulls."

References

External links
 Official website

American talk radio programs
IHeartRadio digital channels
Conservative talk radio